Celebrity Big Brother 2002, also known as Celebrity Big Brother 2, was the second series of the British reality television series Celebrity Big Brother. It was broadcast on Channel 4 in the UK, launching on 20 November 2002, and ending on 29 November 2002, lasting ten days. Proceeds from viewer voting went to four different charities: Centrepoint, National Missing Persons Helpline, Rethink and Samaritans. The series was sponsored by phone company O2. Les Dennis is commonly remembered for his depression during the series following his split from wife Amanda Holden.

Housemates 
Celebrity Big Brother 2 featured a total of six celebrity housemates, below is a table of who they are and what position they finished, unexpectedly the housemates entered and exited the house in exactly the same order (Goldie, Anne, Sue, Melinda, Les and Mark).

Anne Diamond

Anne Diamond (born 8 September 1954) is an English radio and television presenter. She hosted Good Morning Britain on TV-am and the similarly titled Good Morning... with Anne and Nick, alongside co-presenter Nick Owen. However, her presenting style has attracted accusations of "dumbing down". On Day 1, Anne was second to enter the house. On Day 7, she became the second housemate to be evicted from the house, after receiving 50.6% of the public vote.

Goldie

Goldie (born Clifford Joseph Price; 19 September 1965) is a British musician, actor and DJ, well known for his innovations to the jungle and drums and bass music genres. His first studio album Timeless entered the UK Albums Chart at number seven, whilst another Saturnz Return entered at fifteen. Aside from his musical career, his television and film acting credits include The World Is Not Enough, Snatch, Everybody Loves Sunshine, and playing gangster Angel Hudson in EastEnders. He was the first to enter the house on Day 1 and was the first celebrity to be evicted on Day 5.

Les Dennis

Les Dennis (born Leslie Dennis Heseltine; 12 October 1953) is a British comedian, television presenter, and actor, best known for presenting Family Fortunes from 1987 to 2002. He was fifth to enter the house on Day 1. Dennis was commonly remembered in the series for his depression, which was caused following his split from then-wife Amanda Holden. He later described his time in the house as "not one of his wisest moves". However, he continued to be on programme and was declared the runner-up.

Mark Owen

Mark Owen (born 27 January 1972) is an English singer-songwriter, known for being a member of pop group Take That. After the band split up in 1996, Owen became the first ex-member to release solo material. His debut studio album Green Man charted at number 33, which included the singles "Child", "Clementine" and "I Am What I Am". On Day 1, Mark was sixth to enter the house. He was later announced as the winner of the series, earning 77% of the public vote and beating Les. He broke down in tears when he left the house, overwhelmed by the fans' support.

Melinda Messenger

Melinda Messenger (born 23 February 1971) is an English former glamour model and television presenter, most notable for posing topless for Page 3 in The Sun. She continued to work for The Sun until readers voted to ban models with breast implants. On Day 1, Melinda was fourth to enter the house. Whilst in the house, she was described as a "blonde Vulcan" by Sue, who questioned her apparent lack of emotions. She reached third place during the series' final, on Day 10.

Sue Perkins

Sue Perkins (born 22 September 1969) is a British comedian, broadcaster, actress and writer, who rose to prominence through her comedy partnership with Mel Giedroyc in Mel and Sue. Sue was third to enter the house on Day 1. During her time in the house, she had notable moments with Mark and Les. She was third to be evicted from the house on Day 9, with 75% of the public vote.

Nominations table

Notes

:  Les, who failed a task, was the only person allowed to nominate.
: The public were voting for the Housemate they wanted to win rather than to evict.

Viewership
These viewing figures are taken from BARB.

References

External links
Digital Spy page on CBB2

2002 British television seasons
02